Dorcadion tuleskovi is a species of beetle in the family Cerambycidae. It was described by Heyrovsky in 1937. It is known from Greece.

References

tuleskovi
Beetles described in 1937